Coutareopsis is a genus of flowering plants belonging to the family Rubiaceae.

Its native range is Ecuador to Peru.

Species:

Coutareopsis andrei 
Coutareopsis coutaportloides 
Coutareopsis fuchsioides

References

Rubiaceae
Rubiaceae genera